Maneh(Mana) District is a district (bakhsh) in Maneh and Samalqan (Mana and Samangan) County, North Khorasan Province, Iran. At the 2006 census, its population was 26,459, in 6,273 families.  The District has one city: Pish Qaleh.  The District has two rural districts (dehestan): Atrak Rural District and Shirin Su Rural District.

References 

Districts of North Khorasan Province
Maneh and Samalqan County